Ras2 is a Saccharomyces cerevisiae guanine nucleotide-binding protein (encoded by the RAS2 gene) which becomes activated by binding GTP when glucose is present in the environment. It affects growth regulation and starvation response.

Modifications 
Ras2 becomes post-translationally modified in two ways, both being necessary for its activity: Upon activation, palmitoylation at its C terminus takes place and causes attachment from the cytoplasm to the plasma membrane. Farnesylation allows for efficient interaction with the downstream adenylate cyclase Cyr1p. In wild-type yeast deactivated Ras2 is transported to and degraded in the vacuole, a process for which Whi2 is essential. Disturbing this process leads to Ras2 accumulation at the mitochondrial membrane, a behavior that was not observed before.

Ras2-cAMP-PKA pathway 
When activating the adenylate cyclase, Ras2 indirectly raises the cellular cAMP levels, thereby activating the PKA, by which in turn it is downregulated.

Downstream effects 
In a probably indirect manner via the above PKA regulation, Ras2 has a suppressing effect on the yeast general stress response transcription factor Msn2.

Active Ras2 was also found in the nucleus, the reason is currently unknown.

References 

Proteins
Saccharomyces cerevisiae genes